Tennessee Champ is a 1954 American drama film with strong Christian overtones directed by Fred M. Wilcox and starring Shelley Winters, Keenan Wynn, Dewey Martin, and Charles Bronson

Mounted as a title to fill out double and triple bills (a B-movie), Tennessee Champ was one of several films Metro-Goldwyn-Mayer shot in its pet process of Ansco Color, a ruddy-looking process employed on the same year's Brigadoon.

The film marked a return to Hollywood for star Shelley Winters, who hadn't appeared in a film in almost two years because of her marriage to Vittorio Gassman (which ended in June 1954) and the birth of their child, Vittoria. The lull came just as she seemed to be on an upswing after roles in Winchester '73 (1950), Phone Call from a Stranger (1952), and her breakthrough tragic performance in A Place in the Sun (1951).

Plot 
Sarah Wurble's husband Willy is the larceny-inclined manager of an illiterate, and very religious boxer from Tennessee named Danny. Gifted with a powerful punch and a nickname that gives the film its title, Danny mistakenly believes he killed a man defending himself in a street brawl, and goes on the lam as a prizefighter.

His Christian convictions turn out to be both a source of inspiration and, ultimately, conflict when Willy urges him to throw a fight (while mistakenly fearing Willy will turn him in on the murder charge if he doesn't). Credulity flies out of the window when Danny discovers the man he is to take on in the fixed fight is actually the man he thought he killed, Sixty Jubel, The "Biloxi Blockbuster." Danny's example of unwavering faith causes Willy to rethink his sinful ways.

Cast
 Shelley Winters as Sarah
 Keenan Wynn as Willy
 Dewey Martin as Danny
 Earl Holliman as Happy
 Dave O'Brien as Luke MacWade
 Charles Bronson as Sixty
 Yvette Dugay as Blossom
 Frank Richards as J.B. Backett
 Jack Kruschen as Andrews

Reception
According to MGM records the film earned $555,000 in the US and Canada and $214,000 elsewhere, making a loss to the studio of $189,000.

References

External links

Tennessee Champ at TCMDB

1954 films
Metro-Goldwyn-Mayer films
1954 drama films
American drama films
Films directed by Fred M. Wilcox
1950s English-language films
1950s American films